The Stade d'Akouakam is a stadium primarily used for football matches in Oyem, Gabon. It is the home of the Gabonese team US Oyem of the Gabon Championnat National D1. The stadium has capacity of 4,000 spectators.

External links
Venue information

Akouakam
Woleu-Ntem Province